Stephen Huss and Myles Wakefield were the defending champions but did not compete that year.

František Čermák and Leoš Friedl won in the final 6–3, 7–5 against Devin Bowen and Ashley Fisher.

Seeds

  Chris Haggard /  Robbie Koenig (quarterfinals)
  František Čermák /  Leoš Friedl (champions)
  Jared Palmer /  Jeff Tarango (quarterfinals)
  Petr Luxa /  David Škoch (first round)

Draw

External links
 2003 Grand Prix Hassan II Doubles Draw

Doubles
- Doubles, 2003 Grand Prix Hassan Ii